Diadegma angulator is a wasp first described by Aubert in 1963. No subspecies are listed.

References

angulator
Insects described in 1963